Tatiana "Tanya" Mityushina (born 19 February 1993) is a Russian model born in Perm. She was featured in the 2016 Sports Illustrated Swimsuit Issue.

Life and career 
Tanya Mityushina has worked for Victoria's Secret and Intimissimi. She is represented by Elite, LA and IMG, NY. She appeared briefly in the film Don Jon.

In 2016, Mityushina was one of the models chosen for the annual  calendar of the Chilean CCU's Cristal beer.

References

Links 
 
 

Russian female models
People from Perm, Russia
1993 births
Living people